The Blood of the Walsungs is a 1965 West German drama film directed by Rolf Thiele, based on a Thomas Mann novella of the same name written in 1905 and published in 1921. It was entered into the 15th Berlin International Film Festival. The title refers to the ill-fated Völsung clan as told in the Völsunga saga; the roles of Siegmund and Sieglinde refer to Sigmund and Signy as depicted in Richard Wagner's opera Die Walküre. It was shot at the Bavaria Studios in Munich.

Cast
 Michael Maien as Siegmund Arnstatt
 Elena Nathanael as Sieglinde Arnstatt
 Gerd Baltus as Lieutenant Beckerath
  as Rittmeister Kunz Arnstatt
 Rudolf Forster as Count Arnstatt
 Margot Hielscher as Countess Isabella Arnstatt
 Ingeborg Hallstein as Countess Märit Arnstatt
 Heinz-Leo Fischer as Wendelin, a servant
 Karl-Heinz Peters as Florian, a servant
  as Von Gelbsattel, an officer
 Rudolf Rhomberg

References

External links

1965 films
1965 drama films
1960s historical drama films
West German films
1960s German-language films
Films directed by Rolf Thiele
Films based on works by Thomas Mann
Incest in film
Films set in the 1900s
Films set in Munich
German historical drama films
Bavaria Film films
Films shot at Bavaria Studios
1960s German films